Mineiros, population 68,154, is a municipality in the southwest of the state of Goiás, Brazil. Mineiros is the westernmost city in Goiás and a great producer of cattle, soybeans, and corn.

Mineiros is located 430 km from the state capital, Goiânia, and is connected to the large town of Jataí by BR 364. Highway connections from Goiânia are made by BR-060 / Abadia de Goiás / Guapó / Indiara / Acreúna / Rio Verde / Jataí / GO-050 / BR-364. See Sepin

Geography 
It is one of the largest municipalities in the state as well as one of the oldest. It is part of the IBGE statistical microregion of Sudoeste de Goiás.

Origin of the name
The name "Mineiros" comes from the first explorers who were from Minas Gerais. They settled in the region around 1873, building huts, ranch houses, churches, and chapels for saints.

One of these settlers, who came to be known as "João Mineiro", because of his origin in Minas Gerais, was supposedly the first European to settle on the banks of a stream, a tributary of the Verdinho River, which soon was called the stream of the "Mineiro". This stream is the Mineiros stream today.

The first official name was "Mineiro" when the settlement became a "vila" (old name for municipality) in 1905. In 1933 the name was changed to Mineiros as it appears today.

Demographics 
The population density was 5.08 inhabitants/km2 in 2007. The population has more than doubled since 1980, when it was 21,690. While the urban area has increased dramatically, the rural area has surprisingly lost little population in the last 25 years, having 4,506 inhabitants in 2007. The population increased by 2.12% between 2000 and 2007.

Economy 
Considered one of the most prosperous regions of Brazilian agribusiness, the municipality of Mineiros is a great producer of soybeans, corn, sorghum and cotton, as well as beef and dairy cattle. It is the third largest producer of grains in the state. In an axis of 100km from the city there are fields producing more than 1 million tons a year of soybeans and sorghum. Because of this, the city has large grain storage facilities.

In 2007, the city had an industrial district—Distrito Agroindustrial - I e II - DAIM—and there were 66 industrial units registered. The retail sector was very strong with 671 units in 2007. There was a meat-packing house—FRIGOESTRELA - Frigorífico Estrela D'Oeste Ltda—and a dairy—Coop. M. Agrop. do Vale do Araguaia Ltda. The banking sector was represented by 6 institutions: Banco do Brasil, Bradesco, Banco Itaú, CEF, HSBC Bank Brasil, Banco Multiplo, Banco Mercantil do Brasil.

Agriculture 
Like many cities in the state of Goiás the economy is based on cattle raising and agriculture. There were approximately 310,000 head of cattle in the municipality in 2006 of which 34,000 were milk cows. Agricultural production was based on cotton, corn, soybeans, and sorghum.
Main crops in 2006 were:
corn: 25,500 hectares
soybeans: 133,000 hectares
cotton: 2,492 hectares
sorghum: 18,000 hectares
Wheat production has decreased in recent years.

Farm statistics 2006 
Number of farms: 1,247
Agricultural land area: 558,998
Area of permanent crops: 1,490
Area of perennial crops: 108,563
Area of natural pasture: 315,574
Persons working in agriculture: 3,364 (IBGE 2006)

Quality of life 
90% of the urban population is served by a sewage system and chlorinated water.

Health and education 
In 2007 there were 4 hospitals with 217 beds. There were also 8 walk-in health clinics. The infant mortality rate was 16.58 for every 1,000 live births in 2000, having been 39.53 in 1990.

In 2006, the school system had 45 schools with 13,000 students. There were 2 institutions of higher learning: Fundação Integrada Municipal de Ensino Superior-FIMES, Pólo Unopar EAD and a campus of the State University of Goiás—Pólo Universitário da UEG. The adult literacy rate was 88% in 2000.

Municipal Human Development Index 
Life expectancy: 72.1
Adult literacy rate: 86.6%
School attendance rate: 77.9%
MHDI: 0.780
State ranking: 30 (out of 242 municipalities in 2000)
National ranking: 1,046 (out of 5,507 municipalities in 2000)

Tourism 
The city of Mineiros preserves more than 1,000 km2 of native vegetation, in the Parque Nacional das Emas. Created in 1961, the park is 80 km distant from Mineiros and is under the jurisdiction of IBAMA. Its biodiversity is recognized as one of the richest in Latin America. At a distance of 63 km. lies Pedra Aparada, an important ecological site because of its arqueological characteristics. Mineiros also has such attractions as the sulphurous waters of Pilões, Água Emendada, Casa de Pedra, Corrente das Cachoeiras, Mata dos Coqueiros, Mata Típica, Cedro – Quilombo dos Negros, many colonial homes and the Center for Gaucho Traditions.

References

External links 
Mineiros.com

See also
 List of municipalities in Goiás

Municipalities in Goiás
Populated places established in 1939
1939 establishments in Brazil